Dr Aluthwewa Soratha Nayaka Thera is the Viharadhikari of the Kiriwehera Temple Katharagama and also the Chancellor of Uva Wellassa University.

He obtained his PhD in 1990 from the University of Sri Jayewardenepura for the thesis - "The Sri Lankan Bodhi Culture".

He is an alumnus of Nalanda College Colombo.

References

 
 By Janaka Alahapperuma 

 

1943 births
Sri Lankan Buddhist monks
Alumni of Nalanda College, Colombo
Sri Lankan Buddhist missionaries
Sri Lankan Theravada Buddhists
2013 deaths
Alumni of the University of Sri Jayewardenepura